James Bradley Mills (born January 19, 1957) is a former manager of the Houston Astros and a former Major League Baseball (MLB) player. He is the father of retired professional baseball player Beau Mills.

Early life
Mills was educated at Exeter Union High School in California, College of the Sequoias, and the University of Arizona, where he was drafted in the 17th round by the Montreal Expos.

Baseball career

Playing career
Mills reached the major leagues in 1980 and went on to post a .256 batting average with one home run and 12 RBI in 106 games played for the Expos (1980–83). He divided his time between Triple-A and the majors in each of those seasons, and sustained a right knee injury that ended his playing career at the age of 29. A full-time left-handed hitter and primarily a third baseman, he also saw time at first base and second. Mills became a part of major league trivia, when in 1983 he was Nolan Ryan's 3,509th career strikeout victim, lifting Ryan past Walter Johnson as the all-time strikeout leader.

Post-playing career
Mills managed eleven seasons in the minors in the Cubs, Rockies and Dodgers organizations (1987–2002), and also served as an advance scout for the Cubs. Mills was Terry Francona's first-base coach with the Philadelphia Phillies in 1997–2000. In 2003, Mills served as the Montreal Expos bench coach.  From 2004 to 2009, Mills was teamed again with Francona when he served as the bench coach for the Boston Red Sox.

Houston Astros Manager
On October 27, 2009, Mills was named manager of the Houston Astros, replacing interim manager Dave Clark.

Mills holds the dubious distinction of guiding the Astros to the franchise's first ever 100-loss season, which he did in 2011, the trend continued the following season, as his Astros holding the worst record in the majors, Mills was fired on August 18, 2012 along with hitting coach Mike Barnett and first base coach Bobby Meacham. He was succeeded on an interim basis by Oklahoma City RedHawks manager Tony DeFrancesco. The team would go on to finish the season with 100+ losses for the second consecutive year.

Cleveland Indians
On October 31, 2012, Mills was hired as the third base coach of the Cleveland Indians, to work with Francona again. Mills was reassigned as the Indians bench coach in 2014. While coaching for the Boston Red Sox under Francona from 2004 to 2009 he was in the same position. On July 11, 2017, Mills managed the American League All-Star team while Francona dealt with a health issue.

On July 5, 2020, Mills announced he would be opting out of the 2020 season due to the COVID-19 pandemic. The Indians subsequently announced on October 30, 2020 that Mills will not return as bench coach for the 2021 season, but would remain with the club in an undetermined role.

Managerial record

Note: Interim while Terry Francona is out with issue

References

External links

, or Retrosheet

1957 births
Living people
American expatriate baseball players in Canada
Arizona Wildcats baseball players
Baseball coaches from California
Baseball players from California
Boston Red Sox coaches
Chicago Cubs scouts
Cleveland Indians coaches
College of the Sequoias Giants baseball players
Colorado Springs Sky Sox managers
Denver Bears players
Houston Astros managers
Indianapolis Indians players
Iowa Cubs managers
Iowa Cubs players
Las Vegas 51s managers
Major League Baseball bench coaches
Major League Baseball first base coaches
Major League Baseball third base coaches
Major League Baseball third basemen
Memphis Chicks players
Montreal Expos coaches
Montreal Expos players
People from Exeter, California
Philadelphia Phillies coaches
Seton Hall University alumni
Tucson Toros players
West Palm Beach Expos players
Wichita Aeros players